Brelsford is a surname. Notable people with the surname include:

Bill Brelsford (1885–1954), English footballer
James Brelsford (1855–1924), English cricketer
Tom Brelsford (1894–1946), English footballer